Like most former republics of the Soviet Union, Azerbaijan experienced rapid economic development which has led to an increasingly negative impact on the environment, including the inefficient usage of natural resources. The government of Azerbaijan has aimed to increase environmental protection and ensure rational utilization of natural resources, and has introduced a number of important laws, legal documents and state programs in order to improve the ecological situation in the country. However, these precautionary laws have not been as effective as they were meant to be.  Transparency has been a consistent issue in Azerbaijan, as NGOs who are given legal authority to collect data from the oil refineries are often blocked or dismissed, and their information is gathered unofficially. Domestic oil producers have often evaded the regulations, and have not prevented oil leaks into the Caspian Sea. In the next 30 years, Azerbaijan will produce more oil than it produced during the last century, and currently there is little coordination or environmental precaution in the oil drilling operations. There is also a lack of communication with neighboring countries bordering the Caspian Sea.

Health effects 
The most severe forms of pollution are the following: dumped petroleum during the Soviet Period, discharge of sewage, depleted stocks of sturgeon, severe air pollution, and heavy use of pesticides and fertilizers. Many of the locals are constantly exposed to the contaminants, and they have accepted to live in it. Some even comment on the beauty of the ocean with the layer of oil that glisten on the top. Unfortunately, the smell and the ramifications of constant exposure to harmful vapors are a concern to the local health, particularly the coastline of Azerbaijan.  The ramifications of petrol-fueled industries are the following health concerns: harms to the pulmonary, digestive, circulatory, and immune systems. In the worst cases, genetic mutations can occur. Groundwater is also affected by the oil spills causing cancers and bacterial diseases like cholera and hepatitis.

Other forms of pollution 
The following are the principal ecological problems of Azerbaijan:
 The pollution of water resources by way of introduction of contaminated water, including transnational pollution
 The supply of low-quality water to inhabited regions, the loss of fresh water prior to it delivery to the end consumers, insufficient development of sewer systems
 Air pollution from industrial plants and transport vehicles
 Degradation of soil (erosion, desertification, etc.)
 Deforestation as the burning trees affect the climate cycle
 Improper regulation of industry and housing, as well as hazardous solid wastes
 Decline in biological diversity
 Decline in forest reserves and fauna, especially fish results

Forests
Azerbaijan had a 2018 Forest Landscape Integrity Index mean score of 6.55/10, ranking it 72nd globally out of 172 countries.

Conclusion 
The government has focused on these issues and the judicial system has provided laws to safeguard local health. Foreign oil producers and refineries have been more consistent with these regulations, while not all the time, more so than the domestic oil companies. British Petroleum is one such company that attempts to clean the floors of the ocean by separating the contaminants with the rest of the natural setting. Still, locals are without much strength as the people cannot depend on the judicial system to be actionable as the country is still shedding its war-torn past.

See also
 List of environmental issues

References

Environment of Azerbaijan
Azerbaijan